These hits topped the Ultratop 50 in 2000.

See also
2000 in music

References

2000 in Belgium
2000 record charts
2000